Michael Sterling (born October 26, 1960) is an American singer and composer from Miami, Florida. His 1990 single 'Lovers and Friends' was a quiet storm classic, having notably been sampled in Usher, Ludacris and Lil Jon and the East Side Boyz 'Lovers and Friends'. Sterling also worked with Miami artists having produced for MC Shy D, engineered for 2 Live Crew and Poison Clan, and was briefly a member of the Reggae group Inner Circle.

History
His musical career started in his teens when he played bass guitar for popular Latino recording artist Ray Fernandez. Soon afterwards, Sterling and two childhood friends formed the group Silver Platinum, who quickly scored a hit on the R&B charts with their single Dance.  He then went on to play lead guitar and sing as a member of the Grammy award winning reggae band Inner Circle, well known for their hit Bad Boys.

After touring with Inner Circle, Sterling returned to Miami and began his career as a solo artist. During this time, he started his own record label TSOM Records, where he engineered and produced for local artists 2 Live Crew, MC Shy D, Anquette, Poison Clan and others.  He also served as musical director for BMG recording artist Blu Cantrell.

His first album, The Artist, didn't generate much attention. He first struck big time stardom with his second album, No Such Animal, in 1987 produced the songs, 'One More Chance', 'Is It Still Good To Ya' and the timely socially conscious theme song, 'Holiday'. The song, Cheating While She's Wearing My Ring, received a lot of airplay on the video channels (It is not on the album though). His voice is known for its trademark slight sweet and soft falsetto sound.

Later years
During the 1990s and 2000s, Sterling maintained a low profile, while still releasing albums and producing. He still garners rave reviews and fans worldwide.

In 2005, Usher, Ludacris and Lil Jon and the East Side Boyz covered his song, Lovers and Friends from his 1990 album, Trouble. The song was released on the quadruple platinum album Crunk Juice and was the winner of two BMI Billboard awards including ‘Hip Hop Song of the Year'. In 2006, his song Bedroom Boom was covered by The Ying Yang Twins feat. Avant on the platinum Ying Yang CD U.S.A.

On November 17, 2009, volume 1 of his new two volume album, Eyes Around My Heart was released online.

Personal life
Sterling has received the key to Metropolitan Miami Dade County. 

Sterling is married to Irene Rena Sterling.

Discography

Albums

Compilations

Singles

Discography with Inner Circle

Billboard (Writer/Composer)

References

External links
Official website

Living people
American male composers
21st-century American composers
1960 births
Musicians from Miami
American contemporary R&B singers
21st-century American male musicians